The 1983 South Australian National Football League season was the 104th, since 1877, of the South Australian National Football League (SANFL) Australian rules football competition.

The season commenced on Saturday 2 April 1983, and concluded on Saturday 1 October 1983 with the SANFL Grand Final at Football Park with  defeating  by 34 points to claim their eighth premiership and first since 1961.

Escort Cup 
Concurrently with the early rounds of the premiership season, the SANFL also ran the Escort Cup night competition with games usually being played mid-week. The Grand Final of the Cup, played under lights at the Thebarton Oval, saw  win their first competition since they won the 1953 SANFL Grand Final when they defeated  7.15 (57) to 5.7 (37).

With Football Park having lights installed by the 1984 SANFL season, this would be the final time that the night competition would be held at the suburban grounds of Thebarton and Norwood Oval's. From 1984 all night competition games would be held at the league's headquarters. Night football would not return to suburban grounds until the early 2000s when some  home games were scheduled to be held under lights at Norwood Oval.

Premiership season 
Highlights of the season fixture include:
 A 22-round home and away competition
  also hosted  on Anzac Day at the Adelaide Oval.

Round 1

Round 2

Round 3

Round 4

Round 5

Round 6

Round 7

State of Origin Game

Round 8

Round 9

Round 10

State Game

Round 11

Round 12

Round 13

Round 14

Round 15

Round 16

Round 17

Round 18

Round 19

Round 20

Round 21

Round 22

Ladder

Finals series

Elimination Final

Qualifying Final

First Semi Final

Second Semi Final

Preliminary Final

Grand Final

Awards and premiers

Awards 
He kicked 151 goals in the 1983 home and away season.
  were the league minor premiers, finishing top of the ladder at the end of the home and away season with 18 wins and 4 losses. It was the club's 2nd minor premiership in the SANFL.

Premiers 
  were the League premiers, defeating  by 34 points.
  were the Reserves premiers, defeating

Leading Goal Kickers 
 Rick Davies – 151 (SANFL record)
 Neville Roberts – 111 (first Norwood player to kick 100 goals in an SANFL season)
 Grenville Dietrich – 109
 Roger Luders – 105 (first West Adelaide player to kick 100 goals in an SANFL season)

Notes

References 
 1983 SANFL League season

South Australian National Football League seasons
SANFL